Many Wikipedia articles on religious topics are not yet listed on this page. If you cannot find the topic you are interested in on this page, it still may already exist; you can try to find it using the "Search" box. If you find that it exists, you can edit this page to add a link to it.

If you click on "Related changes" at the side of this page, you will see a list of the most recent changes in articles to which this page links. This page links to itself and its talk page so that changes to them can be tracked by the same means.

0–9
1689 Baptist Confession of Faith

A

Abatur   -
Abel   -
Abolitionism   -
Abolitionism in the United States   -
Abraham   -
Abrahamic religion   -
Accommodation   -
Acolyte   -
Acts of Pilate   -
Acts of Thomas   -
Adam   -
Adam Kadmon   -
Adam kasia   -
Adam pagria   -
Adam and Eve   -
Aeon   -
Agnosticism   -
Agnostic Theism   -
Ahmadiyya   -
Ahn Shi Il   -
Aion   -
Akhenaton   -
Alawites   -
Alexandrian Rite   -
All Saints   -
Alleged textual evidence for Jesus   -
Alpha course   -
Altar   -
Altar boy   -
Altar rails   -
Altar server   -
Amazing Grace   -
Ambarvalia   -
Amish   -
Amitābha   -
Anabaptist   -
Anathema   -
Anatta   -
Ancestor-worship   -
Ancient of Days   -
Angel   -
Angels of the zodiac   -
Anglican Communion   -
Anglican continuing churches   -
Anglican views of homosexuality   -
Anglicanism   -
Anglo-Catholicism   -
Animism   -
Anointing   -
Anointing of the Sick   -
Antediluvian   -
Anthropology of religion   -
Anthropomorphism   -
Anti-Arab   -
Anti-Defamation League   -
Anti-Modernist oath   -
Anti-Semitism   -
Anti-Zionism   -
Antichrist   -
Apatheism  -
Apocrypha   -
Apocatastasis   -
Apostles   -
Apostles' Creed   -
Apostolic Pardon   -
Apostolic See   -
Apostolic succession   -
Marian apparition   -
Ara Pacis   -
Arab anti-semitism   -
Aram, son of Shem   -
Aranyaka   -
Arathi   -
Archbishop   -
Archon   -
Ardhanarishvara   -
Arguments against the existence of God   -
Arguments for the existence of God   -
Arianism   -
Arminianism   -
Arul Nool   -
Arzhang   -
Ásatrú   -
Ascension of Jesus Christ   -
Ascetic   -
Ash Wednesday   -
Asherah   -
Ashkenazi   -
Asmodai   -
Assumption of Mary   -
Astrology   -
Aten   -
Athanasian Creed   -
Atharvaveda   -
Atheism   -
Atonement   -
Augur   -
Augustinians   -
Auspice   -
Autocephaly   -
Avatar   -
Awards - 
Ayyavazhi   -
Ayyavazhi mythology   -
Azazel   -
Aztec mythology

B

Baal teshuva   -
Baal   -
Báb   -
Bábism   -
Babylonian calendar   -
Backward message   -
Baháʼí calendar   -
Baháʼí Faith   -
Bahá'u'lláh   -
Bakkah   -
Balaam   -
Balam (demon)   -
Balarama   -
Balor   -
Baptism   -
Baptism for the dead   -
Baptism of the Holy Spirit   -
Immersion baptism   -
Baptistery   -
Bar mitzvah and Bat mitzvah   -
Beatific vision   -
Beast   -
Beelzebub   -
Robert Bellarmine   -
Benedictine   -
Bhagavata Purana   -
Bhakti   -
Bhakti movement   -
Bible   -
The Bible and history   -
Bible translations   -
Biblical canon   -
Biblical inerrancy   -
Jesus in the Christian Bible   -
Biblical maximalism   -
Biblical poetry   -
Biblical Sabbath   -
Binding of Isaac   -
Bioethics   -
Bishops' Bible   -
Bishop   -
Black Madonna   -
Blessed Sacrament   -
Blessed Virgin Mary   -
Blood libel   -
B'nai Noach   -
Bodhisattva   -
Bodhi   -
Bogomilism   -
Book of Enoch   -
The Book of Giants   -
Book of John   -
Book of Mormon   -
Book of Mysteries   -
Books of the Bible   -
Born again   -
Brahma   -
Brahman   -
Brahmana   -
Brahmin   -
Brahma Kumaris   -
Brethren of the Common Life   -
Breviary   -
Brit milah   -
Buddha-nature   -
Buddhism   -
Business ethics

C

Thomas Cajetan   -
Canadian Unitarian Council   -
Calendar of saints   -
Calendar   -
Calvinism   -
Cambridge Declaration   -
Candomblé   -
Canon (priest)   -
Canon law   -
Canons of Dort   -
Cantor (church)   -
Cardinal (Catholicism)   -
Carmelites   -
Carmen Saliare   -
Catechism   -
Catechism of the Catholic Church   -
Catharism   -
Cathedral   -
Cathedral architecture   -
Catholic Apostolic Church   -
Catholic Church   -
Catholic Church against war on Iraq   -
Catholic Communion   -
Catholic King   -
Catholic ministers   -
Sacraments (Catholic Church)   -
Catholicism   -
Celibacy   -
Chalcedonian Creed   -
Charismatic   -
Chayot   -
Cherub   -
Chicago Statement on Biblical Inerrancy   -
Child sacrifice   -
Chinese house church   -
Chosen people   -
Chrismation   -
Christian anti-Semitism   -
Christian anarchism   -
Christian eschatology   -
Christian fundamentalism   -
Christian–Jewish reconciliation   -
Christian Identity   -
Christian mythology   -
Christian Peacemaker Teams   -
Christian Science   -
Christian theological controversy   -
Christian tradition   -
Christianity   -
Christmas   -
Christmas Eve   -
Christology   -
Church   -
Church of England   -
Church militant and church triumphant   -
Church planting   -
Circumcision   -
Civil religion   -
Clergy   -
Clerical celibacy   -
Closed communion   -
College of Cardinals   -
College of Pontiffs   -
Communion   -
Communion of Saints   -
Comparative religion   -
Christianity and Judaism   -
Comparing Eastern and Western religious traditions   -
Concordat   -
Conditional baptism   -
Confession (religion)   -
Confirmation (sacrament)   -
Confucianism   -
Congregation of Christian Brothers   -
Congregationalism   -
Congregationalist church   -
Congregationalist polity   -
Consecration   -
Conservative Judaism   -
Continuous revelation   -
Conversational intolerance   -
Cosmology   -
Counter-Reformation   -
A Course In Miracles   -
Covenant (religion)   -
Covenanter   -
Covenant theology   -
Creationism   -
Creed   -
Criticism of religion   -
Crucifixion   -
Crusade   -
Crypto-Judaism   -
Crypto-Christianity   -
Cult   -
Cult (religion)   -
Curse

D

Dabru Emet   -
Dajjal   -
Day of the Vow   -
Deacon   -
Dead Sea scrolls   -
Death worship   -
Deism   -
Deity   -
Demigod   -
Demiurge   -
Demonology   -
Demon   -
Deuterocanonical books   -
Deuteronomy   -
Devaki   -
Devil   -
Devil's Advocate   -
Dharma   -
Dhimmi   -
Dies Irae   -
Diocese   -
Discordianism   -
Dispensationalism   -
Divination   -
Divine grace   -
Divine healing   -
Divine Liturgy   -
Divine providence   -
Divine simplicity   -
Doctor of the Church   -
Doctrine Doctrine -
Doctrine and Covenants   -
Documentary hypothesis   -
Dogmatic definition   -
Dogma   -
Dominican Order   -
Dominion Theology   -
Dominus Iesus   -
Douai Bible   -
Drabsha   -
Druidry   -
Druze   -
Dualism in cosmology   -
Durga

E

Early Christianity   -
Early Muslim philosophy   -
Earth religion   -
East–West Schism   -
Easter   -
Eastern Christianity   -
Eastern Orthodox Church organization   -
Eastern Orthodoxy   -
Eastern Rite Catholic Churches   -
Ecclesia (sociology of religion)   -
Ecclesial communities contrasted   -
Ecclesiology   -
Eckankar   -
Economics of religion   -
Economy (Eastern Orthodoxy)   -
Ecumenical   -
Ecumenical council   -
Ecumenism   -
Mary Baker Eddy   -
Jonathan Edwards (theology)   -
Egyptian mythology   -
El (deity)   -
El Shaddai   -
Elcesaites   -
Elohim   -
Emanationism   -
Emergency baptism   -
Emerging Church   -
The Enlightenment   -
Eschatology Talk:Eschatology -
Enoch   -
Enos   -
Epiclesis   -
Epiphany   -
Episcopacy   -
Episcopalian   -
Episcopal Church in the United States of America   -
Episcopal Church in Jerusalem and the Middle East   -
Episcopal Church of Scotland   -
Episcopal see   -
Eritrean Orthodox Church   -
Esbat   -
Eschatology   -
Esoteric cosmology   -
Essenes   -
Eternal Marriage   -
Eternity Eternity -
Ethics   -
Ethnic religion   -
Eucharist   -
Evangelicalism   -
Evolution   -
Ex cathedra   -
Excommunication   -
Book of Exodus   -
Exorcism   -
Expository preaching   -
Extra Ecclesiam Nulla Salus

F

Father of Greatness   -
Faith   -
Fall   -
Fallen angel   -
Free Christians (Britain)   -
Feast of the Lemures   -
Fetishism   -
Fideism   -
Filioque clause   -
First Vatican Council   -
Five Pillars of Islam   -
Five solas   -
Fleur de lys   -
Flirty Fishing   -
Flying Spaghetti Monster   -
Folk religion   -
Forgiveness   -
Fratres Arvales   -
Free Church of Scotland   -
Free will   -
Full communion   -
Full Gospel   -
Fundamental Epistle   -
Fundamentalism   -
Funeral

G

Gabriel   -
Ganesha   -
Ganzibra   -
Gautama Buddha   -
Genesis   -
Geneva Bible   -
Genie   -
Gersonides   -
Ginza Rabba   -
Glossolalia   -
Gnosticism   -
God   -
God and gender   -
Names of God   -
Goddess worship   -
Goddess   -
Godhead (Christianity)   -
Gog   -
The Golden Bough   -
Gospel of John   -
Gospel of Luke   -
Gospel of Mani   -
Gospel of Mark   -
Gospel of Matthew   -
Gospel of Thomas   -
Grace   -
Great Apostasy   -
Great Bible   -
Greek mythology   -
Greek Orthodox Church   -
Greek religion   -
Gregorian calendar   -
Gregorian chant   -
Guru

H

Hagiography   -
Hail Mary   -
Haitian Vodou   -
Halakha   -
Hanuman   -
Haran Gawaita   -
Haredi Judaism   -
Harihara   -
Harran   -
Harrowing of Hell   -
Haruspex   -
Hasidim   -
Hasidism   -
Hayyi Rabbi   -
Heaven   -
Hebrew Bible   -
Hebrew calendar   -
Hebrew   -
Hell   -
Hellenic polytheism   -
Hellenistic religion   -
Henotheism   -
Herem (censure)   -
Herem (priestly gift)   -
Herem (war or property)   -
Heresy   -
Hermeticism   -
Hermoea   -
Heterodoxy   -
High Sabbaths   -
Hinduism   -
Hiram Abiff   -
Historical episcopate   -
History of ancient Israel and Judah   -
History of Christianity   -
History of the English Bible   -
History of Unfulfilled Prophecy by Christians   -
History of Islam   -
Holidays   -
Holocaust theology   -
Holocaust   -
Holy card   -
Holy Day of Obligation   -
Holy Inquisition   -
Holy Living and Holy Dying   -
Holy Orders   -
Holy Prepuce   -
Holy See   -
Holy Spirit   -
Holy Synod   -
Holy water   -
Homeric hymns   -
Homosexuality and morality   -
Homosexuality   -
House church   -
Human sacrifice   -
Humanism   -
Hymn   -
Hyper-Calvinism

I
Icon   -
Iconoclasm   -
Iconography   -
Iconostasis   -
Idolatry   -
Ifá   -
Iguvine Tables   -
Imam   -
Impiety   -
Imperial cult   -
Incarnation   -
Indulgence   -
Infidel   -
Inquisition   -
Institute of the Brothers of the Christian Schools   -
Integral theory (Ken Wilber)   -
Intelligent design   -
Intercommunion   -
Involution (esoterism)   -
Irreligion   -
Irresistible grace   -
Isaac   -
Isaiah   -
Ishta-Deva   -
Ishmael   -
Ishvara   -
Islam   -
Islam and anti-Semitism   -
Islam and Judaism   -
Islamic calendar   -
Islamic view of Jesus   -
Islamism   -
Isma'ilism   -
Israel

J
Jacob   -
Jainism   -
James the Just   -
Jehovah's Witnesses   -
Jehovah's Witnesses and the Holocaust   -
Jerusalem   -
Jesus as Christ and Messiah   -
Jesus   -
Jew   -
Jewish eschatology   -
Jewish fundamentalism   -
Jewish history timeline   -
Jewish holidays   -
Jewish principles of faith   -
Jewish services   -
Jewish Theological Seminary of America   -
Jewish views on marriage   -
Jewish views on religious pluralism   -
Jews for Jesus   -
Jihad   -
John the Baptist   -
Jordan River   -
Jubilee (Biblical)   -
Jubilee (Christian)   -
Judaism   -
Jumu'ah   -
Justification (theology)

K
Kabbalah   -
Kairos   -
Kairos retreat   -
Kali   -
Karaite Judaism   -
Karma   -
Kartikeya   -
Kashrut   -
Kenosis   -
King James Version of the Bible   -
King-James-Only Movement   -
Kingdom of Israel (Samaria)   -
Klila   -
Kohen   -
Kollel   -
Korban   -
Krishna   -
Krishnaism   -
Krun

L
Laity   -
Lakshmi   -
Last Judgment   -
Latin Rite   -
Latria   -
Latrocinium   -
Latter Rain Movement   -
Laufa   -
Lay presidency   -
Lay Reader   -
Lector   -
Legalism (theology)   -
Leviathan   -
Leviticus   -
Liberal Judaism (disambiguation)   -
Light Upon Light   -
Lilith   -
Limited atonement   -
Liturgical colours   -
Liturgical hymn   -
Liturgical Year   -
Liturgy   -
Louisiana Voodoo   -
Luciferianism   -
Lucifer   -
Lupercalia   -
Lutheran Church

M
Magic (paranormal)   -
Magic (religion)   -
Magnificat   -
Magus   -
Mahabharata   -
Mahayana   -
Maimonides   -
Major orders   -
Manda d-Hayyi   -
Mandaeans   -
Mandaeism   -
Mandi   -
Mani   -
Manichaeism   -
Marcionism   -
Mariamman   -
Marian apparitions   -
Maronite   -
Marriage   -
Mary, the mother of Jesus   -
Mary Magdalene   -
Masbuta   -
Masiqta   -
Masoretic text   -
Masorti   -
Mass (liturgy)   -
Mass (music)   -
Massacre of the Innocents   -
Matarta   -
Cotton Mather   -
Increase Mather   -
Meditation   -
Meforshim   -
Megachurch   -
Mephistopheles   -
Merkabah   -
Messiah   -
Messianic Judaism   -
Methodism   -
Methods of divination   -
Metrical psalter   -
Metropolitan bishop   -
Michael (archangel)   -
Midrash   -
Mikvah   -
Millennialism   -
Millerites   -
Minor orders   -
Minority religion   -
Miracle   -
Miriai   -
Miriam   -
Mishnah   -
Mithraism   -
Mitzvah   -
Modern Orthodox Judaism   -
Moloch   -
Monad   -
Monastery   -
Monasticism   -
Monism   -
Monk   -
Monophysitism   -
Monotheism   -
Moral community   -
Moravian Church   -
Moriah   -
Mormonism   -
Edgardo Mortara   -
Moses   -
Mosque   -
Mount Sinai   -
Mourning   -
Muhammad   -
Multisensory worship   -
Mun (religion)   - 
Mussar Movement   -
Mysticism   -
Myths and legends surrounding the Papacy

N
Nanda   -
Nasheed   -
Natural theology   -
Nazarenes   -
Neo-druidism   -
Neopaganism -
Neoplatonism -
Neoplatonism Christian -
-
Nestorianism   -
New Age   -
New moon   -
New Testament   -
Nicene Creed   -
Nirvana (concept)   -
Nirvana (Jainism)   -
Noah   -
Nontheistic religions   -
Nontrinitarianism   -
Norse mythology   -
Numinous   -
Number of the Beast (numerology)

O
Oahspe   -
Occult   -
Old English Bible translations   -
Old Testament   -
Omen   -
Omnipotence   -
Omniscience   -
One Holy Catholic and Apostolic Church   -
Opus Dei   -
Order of the Solar Temple   -
Organizational structure of Jehovah's Witnesses   -
Oriental Orthodoxy   -
Original sin   -
Orthodoxy   -
Orthodox Baháʼí Faith   -
Orthodox Christian Mission Center   -
Orthodox Judaism

P
Paganism   -
Pali canon   -
Pali   -
Panentheism   -
Pange Lingua   -
Pantheism   -
Papal abdication   -
Papal bull   -
Papal coronation   -
Papal election   -
Papal infallibility   -
Papal States   -
Papal tiara   -
Paradise   -
Parentalia   -
Paraclete   -
Parousia   -
Particular church   -
Parvati   -
Parwanaya   -
Passover   -
Patriarch   -
Patron god   -
Patron saint   -
Paul of Tarsus   -
Paulicianism   -
Pauline Christianity   -
Peace   -
Pearl of Great Price   -
Pelagianism   -
Pentateuch   -
Pentecostalism   -
People of the Book   -
Permanent deacon   -
Perpetual virginity of Mary   -
Persecution of Christians   -
Persian religions   -
Peter   -
Pharisee   -
Philistine   -
Philosophy of religion   -
Phronema   -
Pietism   -
Pilgrim's Progress   -
Pilgrimage   -
Pleroma   -
Plural Marriage (Mormonism)   -
Political religion   -
Polytheism   -
Polytheistic reconstructionism   -
Pontiff   -
Pontifex Maximus   -
Pope   -
Port-Royal   -
Posek   -
Pow-wow (folk magic)   -
Practices of Jehovah's Witnesses   -
Pradyumna   -
Pragmateia   -
Prakrit   -
Praxis (Orthodox)   -
Prayer   -
Prayer for the dead   -
Predestination   -
Pre-existence   -
Presbyterian   -
Presbyterian Church   -
Presbytery (sacred architecture)   -
Prevenient grace   -
Priesthood (Mormonism)   -
Priesthood of all believers   -
Priest   -
Primacy of the Roman Pontiff   -
Primate (bishop)   -
Prince of Darkness   -
Probabilism   -
The problem of evil   -
The problem of Hell   -
Process theology   -
Projects working for peace among Israelis and Arabs   -
Prophet   -
Prophets of Islam   -
Protestantism   -
Protestant Reformation   -
Proto-Indo-European religion   -
Psalm   -
Psalms of Asaph   -
Psalms of Thomas   -
Pseudoscience   -
Psilanthropism   -
Ptahil   -
Purgatory   -
Purim   -
Puritan   -
Purusha   -
Pythagoreanism

Q

Qolasta  
Quietism (Christian philosophy)   -
Qur'an

R
Rabbi   -
Rabbinical Assembly   -
Rabbinic literature   -
Radha   -
Raëlism   -
Raja Yoga   -
Rama   -
Ramadan   -
Raphael (angel)   -
Rasta   -
Rastafari movement   -
Rationalism   -
Rebbe   -
Rebirth   -
Reconstructionist Judaism   -
Red Sea   -
Reform Judaism   -
Reincarnation   -
Religion   -
Religion and abortion   -
Religion and homosexuality   -
Religion in Ancient Rome   -
Religion in Canada   -
Religion in Germany   -
Religion in India   -
Religion in pre-Islamic Arabia   -
Religion in the United States   -

Religious aspects of marriage   -
Religious conversion   -
Religious cosmology   -
Religious denomination   -
Religious ecstasy   -
Religious Humanism   -
Religious intolerance   -
Religious persecution   -
Religious pluralism   -
Religious studies   -
Repentance   -
Requiem   -
Responsa   -
Restorationism (Christian primitivism)   -
Restoration (Mormonism)   -
Resurrection   -
Resurrection of Jesus   -
Revelation   -
Reverence   -
Rhema   -
RHEMA Bible Training Center   -
Righteousness   -
Rigveda   -
Rishama   -
Ritual purification   -
Ritual washing in Judaism   -
Role of women in Judaism   -
Roman Catholic Church sex abuse allegations   -
Romanian Orthodox Church   -
Roman mythology   -
Romans road   -
Rosh Hashanah   -
Ruha

S
Sabbath economics   -
Sabbath in Christianity   -
Sabbath in seventh-day churches   -
Sabbath mode   -
Sabbath School   -
Sabellianism   -
Sabians   -
Sacrament   -
Sacramental bread   -
Sacramental character   -
Sacramental index   -
Sacred (comparative religion)   -
Sacred Heart   -
Sacred king   -
Sacred language   -
Sacred text   -
Sacred Tradition   -
Sacrifice   -
Sadducee   -
Samhita   -
Saraswati   -   
Sai Baba   -
Saint   -
Saints, calendar of   -
Salvation   -
Samael   -
Samaritanism   -
Samaritans   -
Samba   -
Samaveda   -
Sanctification   -
Sanskrit   -
Sarah   -
Satanism   -
Satan   -
Sathya Sai Baba   -
Saturday   -
Saturnalia   -
Scapegoat   -
Scientology Talk:Scientology -
Scofield Reference Bible   -
Seal of the Prophets   -
Second Coming   -
Second Great Awakening   -
Second Vatican Council   -
Secondary conversion   -
Sect   -
Secular humanism   -
Seder   -
Sede vacante   -
Sedevacantism   -
Seir   -
Sephardic Judaism   -
Sephardi   -
Septuagint   -
Seraph   -
Sermon on the Mount   -
Sermon   -
Seth   -
Seven-day week   -
Shabbat   -
Shabbat (Talmud)   -
Shabbaton   -
Shabbos goy   -
Shabuhragan   -
Shaivism   -
Shakti   -
Shaktism   -
Shamanism   -
Shappatum   -
Sharia   -
Shavuot   -
Shem   -
Shiite   -
Shinto   -
Shirk (idolatry)   -
Shishlam   -
Shiva   -
Shmita   -
Shofar   -
Shrine   -
Shrines to the Virgin Mary   -
Shunning   -
Siddur   -
Sikhism   -
Sikhs   -
Sign of the cross   -
Signs and Wonders   -
Simony   -
Sin   -
Sira   -
Sita   -
Skepticism   -
Sky Father   -
Slain in the Spirit   -
Smarta tradition   -
Smith, Joseph, Jr.   -
Socinianism   -
Sodom and Gomorrah   -
Sol Invictus   -
Solar Deity   -
Sophia   -
Soul sleep   -
Spirit   -
Spiritism   -
Spiritual (music)   -
Spiritual possession   -
Spiritualism (religious movement)   -
Spiritualism   -
Spirituality   -
State religion   -
Stations of the Cross   -
Subhadra   -
Suburbicarian diocese   -
Succubus   -
Sufi   -
Suitheism   -
Sukkot   -
Sumerian religion   -
Sunnah   -
Sunni   -
Supernatural   -
Supersessionism   -
Superstition   -
Supreme Pontiff   -
Surat Shabd Yoga   -
Sutra   -
Svayam Bhagavan   -
Sydney Anglicans   -
Syllabus of Errors   -
Synagogue   -
Syncretism

T
Tabernacle   -
Taga   -
Tathagatagarbha doctrine   -
Tallit   -
Talmud   -
Tanakh   -
Taoism   -
Tarmida   -
Tawhid   -
Tefillin   -
Temple in Jerusalem   -
Temple (Latter Day Saints)   -
Temple   -
Temple menorah   -
Ten Commandments   -
The Ten Gurus of Sikhism   -
Territorial Spirits   -
Tetragrammaton   -
Thai lunar calendar   -
Thealogy   -
Theism   -
Theodicy   -
Theology   -
Theoria   -
Theosis   -
Theosophy (Boehmian)   -
Theosophy (Blavatskian)   -
Theravada   -
Third Wave of the Holy Spirit   -
Thirty-Nine Articles   -
Three-Chapter Controversy   -
Three Wise Men   -
Tibetan Buddhism   -
Tipitaka   -
Torah study   -
Torah   -
Tosefta   -
Total depravity   -
Totemism   -
Toward the Light   -
Tract (liturgy)   -
Transcendentalism   -
Transfiguration   -
Transubstantiation   -
Translation (religion)   -
Treasure of Life   -
Trimurti   -
Trinitarian formula   -
Trinitarianism   -
Trinity   -
Tripitaka   -
Tutelary

U
Umbanda   -
Unitarianism   -
Unitarian Universalism   -
Unitarian Universalist Association   -
United Synagogue of Conservative Judaism   -
Universalism   -
Universi Dominici gregis   -
Upanishad   -
Uposatha   -
Ur   -
The Urantia Book   -
Uriel   -
Uthra   -
Utopianism

V
Vaishnavism   -
Vajrayana   -
Valentinianism   -
The Varieties of Religious Experience   -
Vajrayana   -
Vasudeva   -
Vatican Hill   -
Vatican II   -
Vegetarianism and religion -
Veneration   -
Vespers   -
Vetus Latina   -
Vibhuti   -
Vindhyavasini   -
Vineyard Movement   -
Viruses of the Mind   -
Vishnu   -
Vow of celibacy   -
Vulgate

W
Wahhabi   -
Week   -
Charles Wesley   -
John Wesley   -
West African Vodun   -
Western Orthodoxy   -
Western Schism   -
Western Wall   -
Westminster Confession of Faith   -
Westminster Larger Catechism   -
Westminster Shorter Catechism   -
Wheel of the Year   -
Ellen G. White   -
The White Goddess   -
Whore of Babylon   -
Wicca   -
Roger Williams   -
John Wimber   -
Witches' Sabbath   -
Witch of Endor   -
Women   -
Word of Knowledge   -
World of Darkness   -
World of Light   -
Worship   -
Worship dance   -
Wudu

X

Xmas

Y
Yajurveda   - 
Yahweh   -
Yarsanism   -
Yashoda   -
Yazdânism   -
Yazidis   -
Yazidism   -
Yeshiva University   -
Yeshiva   -
Yeshu   -
Yeshua (name)   -
Yom Kippur   -
Yoruba mythology   -
Brigham Young   -
Yushamin

Z
Zen   -
Zionism   -
Zohar   -
Zoroaster   -
Zoroastrianism   -
Zurvanism

Lists

613 commandments  
List of Ayyavazhi-related articles  
List of Ayyavazhi organisations  
List of Bible stories  
List of Biblical names  
List of Buddhist topics  
List of Cathedrals  
List of Catholic priests  
List of Christian denominations  
List of Christian Universalists  
List of deities  
List of Di Indigetes  
List of founders of religious traditions  
List of Greek mythological characters  
List of Hinduism-related articles  
List of hymnals  
List of Islamic terms in Arabic  
List of Jain topics
List of Jains
List of Jain temples
List of Jesus-related articles  
List of Messianic Jewish organizations  
List of monasteries dissolved by Henry VIII of England  
List of articles about Mormonism  
List of Muslims  
List of names for the Biblical nameless  
List of Patriarchs of Antioch  
List of Patriarchs of Constantinople  
List of people by belief  
List of popes  
List of religions and spiritual traditions  
List of religious ideas in science fiction  
List of religious ideas in fantasy fiction  
List of religious organizations  
List of saints  
List of spirituality-related topics  
List of sutras  
List of theological demons  
List of Unitarians, Universalists, and Unitarian Universalists  
List of Unitarian, Universalist, and Unitarian Universalist churches  
Buddhist terms and concepts  
Depiction of Jesus  
Ninety-nine names of Allah  
Unitarian martyrs